Osmania College is a provincial school in Jaffna, Sri Lanka. It was once a prominent educational institution for the city's Muslim community.

History
Osmania College, located in Jaffna's Moor Town suburb, conducted classes ranging from kindergarten to Advanced Level. In 1980 it had roughly 800 students. By 1990 it had grown to 1,800. It closed in 1990 after the expulsion of Muslims from Northern Province by the Liberation Tigers of Tamil Eelam; the city's Muslims were told to gather at the college on 30 October 1990, and then given two hours to leave, with only the clothes on their backs and Rs 50 in cash. Afterwards, the school buildings were destroyed in fighting due to the Sri Lankan Civil War, and furniture was looted.

Reopening
With the resettlement of Muslim families back into Jaffna, Osmania College reopened in 2003, but without facilities for holding lessons. By 2005, it had grown to 200 students, up to the Ordinary Level; teachers held classes on the ground floor of single, crumbling building which remained of the former campus. However, as suspicions grew that the ceasefire would break down, Muslims again left the city, and by early 2006 only 35 students remained at the school. In 2009, Jaffna District member of parliament and Minister of Social Services Douglas Devananda stated that the government would assist in the rebuilding of the college, as part of a wider plan of community resettlement and rebuilding in Jaffna.

Osmaniya College construction was started in 1960. Muslim General public in Jaffna has given donation to construct the building. On 7th of January 1963 Osmaniya College was  declared open by Badiuddeen Mahmood then Minister of Education. When opening, the school has only ground floor of the current building. Upstairs building was constructed later with the allocation of fund by the Minister Badiuddeen Mahmood. 

GCE Advance Level was started in 1974 by the then Principal A.H. Hameem. Osmaniya College has produced a countable number of graduates. College has created BA, BBA, BCom, BUMS(unani Medical science) , B Eng graduates.  In sports the School has achieved many awards. in 1975 the School third eleven soccer team won the Jaffna School Soccer Association (JSSA) championship under the captainship of Safeek Ramees. In 1985 the school Second Eleven bacame champions in JSSA tournament under the captaincy of Mohamed Sharief Mohamed Jansin.  

The school's performance in athletic events also remarkable. The school had students who won circuit level, District level champions in 100 m, 20 m, 400 m, 800m. 1500 m, 3000 m and 5000 m, high jump, long jump, shot put and discuss through. 

Damaged building were reconstructed time to time from 2011.  Still few buildings to be reconstructed.

See also
 List of schools in Northern Province, Sri Lanka

References

Provincial schools in Sri Lanka
Schools in Jaffna